The Eddie "Lockjaw" Davis Cookbook Volume 3 is an album by saxophonist Eddie "Lockjaw" Davis with organist Shirley Scott recorded in 1958 for the Prestige label. The album was the third of Davis' popular "Cookbook" volumes to be released.

Reception
The Allmusic review awarded the album 3 stars and stated "Scott shows that she was one of the top organists to emerge after the rise of Jimmy Smith. But Davis is the main star, and his instantly recognizable sound is the most memorable aspect of this swinging session".

Track listing 
All compositions by Eddie "Lockjaw" Davis and Shirley Scott except as indicated
 "I'm Just a Lucky So-and-So" (Mack David, Duke Ellington) - 6:12   
 "Heat 'n' Serve" - 7:20   
 "My Old Flame" (Sam Coslow,  Arthur Johnston) - 6:01   
 "The Goose Hangs High" - 5:52   
 "Simmerin'" - 9:25   
 "Strike Up the Band" (George Gershwin, Ira Gershwin) - 3:37  
Recorded at Van Gelder Studio in Hackensack, New Jersey on September 12 (tracks 1 & 6) and December 5 (tracks 2-5), 1958

Personnel 
 Eddie "Lockjaw" Davis - tenor saxophone
 Shirley Scott - organ
 Jerome Richardson - flute (tracks 4 & 5), baritone saxophone (track 2), tenor saxophone (track 3)
 George Duvivier - bass
 Arthur Edgehill - drums

References 

Eddie "Lockjaw" Davis albums
1960 albums
Albums produced by Esmond Edwards
Albums recorded at Van Gelder Studio
Prestige Records albums
Shirley Scott albums